Monstera siltepecana is a species of flowering plant in the genus Monstera native to the wet tropical biomes of southern Mexico and Central America. Like other Monstera species, it is a vining plant and as it matures, develops holes in its leaves. Especially in immature foliage, it has distinctive silver venation.
The monstera siltepecana is a very fast growing plant along with the other arum family members.

References 

siltepecana
Plants described in 1950